The 2020 Hun Sen Cup is the 14th season of the Hun Sen Cup, the premier football knockout tournament in Cambodia, for association football clubs in Cambodia involving Cambodian League and provincial teams organized by the Football Federation of Cambodia. Beoung Ket won the cup after beating Svay Rieng 5-4 on Penalty in the 2019 final. It was Beoung Ket's first time winning the cup. The competition is split into 2 stages with the first being the provincial stage before the national stage sees the 2020 C-League teams enter the competition.

The provincial stage started in February 2020.

Format

Provincial stage
The provincial stage started in February 2020 and was contested between 17 teams across 5 groups. All of the 17 teams across represent their respective province, not just the city that the team plays in.

 Group stage: 17 teams are split into 5 groups (2 groups of 4 and 3 groups of 3). The group winners and the 3 best runners-up (does not count the matches vs 4th-placed team in group A and E) qualified for the knockout stage.
 Provincial Knockout Stage: 8 teams play in a single-elimination home & away matches, except the single-leg third-place playoff and final match. Top 4 teams will qualify for National Stage.

National Stage 
The National Stage sees the 12 2020 C-League teams (except Bati Youth Football Academy) enter the competition, along with the top 4 teams in the provincial stage. 16 teams play in a single-elimination home & away matches, except the single-leg semi-finals, third-place playoff and final match. The winners will qualify for 2021 AFC Cup qualifying playoff stage.

Provincial Group stage

Group A

Group B

Group C

Group D

Group E

Ranking of second-placed teams

Provincial Knockout Stage

Bracket

Quarter-finals 
Winners will qualify for National Stage.

1st Leg

2nd Leg

4-4 on aggregate. Siem Reap Province FC won on penalties.Prey Veng FC won 8-1 on aggregate.Tboung Khmum FC won 3-1 on aggregate.

Kep FC won 6-4 on aggregate.

Semi-finals

1st leg

2nd leg 
Prey Veng FC won 9-0 on aggregate.Tboung Khmum FC won 5-2 on aggregate.

Final and third-place playoff

Third-place playoff

Final

National Round of 16

1st leg

2nd leg 
Nagaworld won 4-2 on aggregate.Preah Khan Reach Svay Rieng won 3-0 on aggregate. Phnom Penh Crown won 10-0 on aggregate.1-1 on aggregate. Kirivong Sok Sen Chey won 4-3 on penalties.Visakha won 13-1 on aggregate.Boeung Ket won 18-0 on aggregate.Tiffy Army won 14-3 on aggregate.Prey Veng won 5-4 on aggregate.

National Quarter-finals

1st leg

2nd leg 
Phnom Penh Crown won 4-2 on aggregate.Nagaworld won 4-3 on aggregate.4-4 on aggregate. Prey Veng won 5-4 on penalties.4-4 on aggregate. Visakha won 4-3 on penalties.

National Semi-finals

National Third-place

National Final match 
The winner is guaranteed a spot for the 2021 AFC Cup playoffs.

Awards

 Top goal scorer : Vuth Tola of Prey Veng (6 goals)
 Player of the season : Chrerng Polroth of Visakha
 Goalkeeper of the Season : Keo Soksela of Visakha
 Coach of the season : Colum Curtis of Visakha
 Fair Play: Prey Veng

References 

Hun Sen Cup seasons
2020 in Cambodian football
Cambodia